Ladera Heights is a community and unincorporated area in Los Angeles County, California. The population was 6,634 at the 2020 census.  Culver City lies to its west, the Baldwin Hills neighborhood to its north, the View Park-Windsor Hills community to its east, the Westchester neighborhood to its south and southwest and the city of Inglewood to its southeast. With an average household income of $132,824, Ladera Heights ranks third amongst the ten wealthiest Black communities in the United States.

History
Ladera Heights originated in the late 1940s with the development of "Old Ladera". In the 1960s, custom homes were built in "New Ladera". Prominent architect builders included Valentine and Gallant. Robert Earl, who designed many of the Valentine homes, went on to build large multimillion-dollar estates throughout Southern California and in other countries.  Neighboring Fox Hills contained a golf course with rolling hills that backed up to Wooster Avenue. Valentine built Robert Earl designed homes on Wooster overlooking the Fox Hills golf course. Years later, Donald Trump asked Earl to design estate homes with panoramic views of his Palos Verdes golf course.

Baseball player Frank Robinson and other sports players began moving to Ladera Heights in the early 1970s.  Many celebrities have lived in Ladera Heights over the years, including Peter Vidmar, Vanessa Williams, Chris Darden, Chris Strait, Lisa Leslie, Olympia Scott, Ken Norton, Arron Afflalo, Tyler, The Creator, Michael Cooper and Byron Scott.
Ladera Heights is known as a residence for affluent African Americans.

Retail
Ladera Heights Shopping Center (at the northwest side of the junction of La Tijera, La Cienega, and Centinela boulevards) hosted a Henshey's Department Store from 1966 to 1990 and what was popularly known as Magic Johnson Starbucks, a Starbucks owned by Magic Johnson from 1998 to 2018. The center is currently anchored by Ross Dress for Less and a Ralphs supermarket.

Geography

Most of the area is in unincorporated Los Angeles County, with a small section in the neighborhood of Ladera, Los Angeles, within the City of Los Angeles.

Ladera Heights is portioned into three sections, known as "Upper Ladera," "Lower Ladera" and "Old Ladera". Upper Ladera includes all houses north of Slauson in between La Cienega Boulevard and Shenandoah Avenue, while Lower Ladera (the larger of the two) consists of all houses south of Slauson in between Wooster and La Cienega. Old Ladera is the small area just east of La Cienega and south of Slauson. The Ladera Center, located in Lower Ladera just west of La Cienega Boulevard, hosts a number of local franchise stores and eateries.

Demographics

2020 census
As of end of 2020, Ladera Heights ranks #3 among the top 10 richest black communities in US, with an average family income of $132,824.

Note: the US Census treats Hispanic/Latino as an ethnic category. This table excludes Latinos from the racial categories and assigns them to a separate category. Hispanics/Latinos can be of any race.

2010 Census

The 2010 US Census reported that Ladera Heights had a population of 6,498. The racial makeup of Ladera Heights was 4,786 (73.7%) African American, 979 (15.1%) White (13.3% Non-Hispanic White),  20 (0.3%) Native American, 231 (3.6%) Asian, 2 (0.0%) Pacific Islander, 134 (2.1%) from other races, and 346 (5.3%) from two or more races. Hispanic or Latino of any race were 355 people (5.5%).

The census reported that 6,486 people (99.8% of the population) lived in households, 8 (0.1%) lived in non-institutionalized group quarters, and 4 (0.1%) were institutionalized.

There were 2,751 households, 702 (25.5%) had children under the age of 18 living in them, 1,240 (45.1%) were opposite-sex married couples living together, 462 (16.8%) had a female householder with no husband present, 113 (4.1%) had a male householder with no wife present.  There were 93 (3.4%) unmarried opposite-sex partnerships, and 20 (0.7%) same-sex married couples or partnerships. 778 households (28.3%) were one person and 351 (12.8%) had someone living alone who was 65 or older. The average household size was 2.36.  There were 1,815 families (66.0% of households); the average family size was 2.88.

The age distribution was 1,122 people (17.3%) under the age of 18, 401 people (6.2%) aged 18 to 24, 1,264 people (19.5%) aged 25 to 44, 2,183 people (33.6%) aged 45 to 64, and 1,528 people (23.5%) who were 65 or older.  The median age was 49.0 years. For every 100 females, there were 79.7 males.  For every 100 females age 18 and over, there were 75.1 males.

There were 2,867 housing units at an average density of 966.7 per square mile, of the occupied units 2,027 (73.7%) were owner-occupied and 724 (26.3%) were rented. The homeowner vacancy rate was 1.1%; the rental vacancy rate was 6.7%.  4,891 people (75.3% of the population) lived in owner-occupied housing units and 1,595 people (24.5%) lived in rental housing units.

During 2009–2013, Ladera Heights had a median household income of $99,563, with 4.7% of the population living below the federal poverty line.

2000 Census
At the 2000 census there were 6,568 people, 2,691 households, and 1,883 families residing in the census-designated place (CDP). The racial makeup of the CDP was 70.8% African American, 7.0% White, 2.9% Asian, 0.3% Native American, 0.1% Pacific Islander, 1.4% from other races, and 4.5% from two or more races. Hispanic or Latino of any race were 3.4%.

Of the 2,691 households 26.5% had children under the age of 18 living with them, 51.0% were married couples living together, 15.7% had a female householder with no husband present, and 30.0% were non-families. 24.8% of households were one person and 9.1% were one person aged 65 or older.  The average household size was 2.44 and the average family size was 2.89.

The age distribution was 20.7% under the age of 18, 5.4% from 18 to 24, 24.5% from 25 to 44, 29.8% from 45 to 64, and 19.5% 65 or older.  The median age was 44 years. For every 100 females, there were 81.9 males.  For every 100 females age 18 and over, there were 77.7 males.

The median household income was $90,233 and the median family income  was $103,174. Males had a median income of $64,643 versus $52,750 for females. The per capita income for the CDP was $47,798.  About 1.1% of families and 3.7% of the population were below the poverty line, including 2.5% of those under age 18 and 5.9% of those age 65 or over.

Education

Primary and secondary schools
Most of Ladera Heights is served by the Inglewood Unified School District. The schools serving Ladera Heights are in the Inglewood city limits. As of 2006 fewer than 400 Ladera Heights residents attended Inglewood USD schools. La Tijera School (K-8) and Parent School (K-8) serve Ladera Heights. La Tijera and Parent feed into Inglewood High School.

In 2006, a group of residents petitioned to move the area into the Culver City Unified School District of Culver City. Both the Culver City USD and the Inglewood USD opposed the move.

As of 2014 the Wiseburn School District allows parents in Ladera Heights to send their children to Wiseburn schools on inter-district transfers.

Colleges and universities
West Los Angeles College, a community college, is in Ladera Heights.

Services
Ladera Heights receives fire protection from the Los Angeles County Fire Department.

The Los Angeles County Sheriff's Department (LASD) operates the Marina del Rey Station in Marina del Rey, serving Ladera Heights.

The Los Angeles County Department of Health Services SPA 5 West Area Health Office serves Ladera Heights.

Government

Parks and recreation
Ladera Park is  adjacent to the View Park-Windsor Hills and the City of Inglewood. The park has an outdoor amphitheatre, a baseball–softball diamond field, a basketball court, children's play areas, a community recreation center, water fountains, picnic areas with barbecue grills and tennis courts.

Notable people from Ladera Heights
 Arron Afflalo
 Maia Campbell
 Chris Darden
 Randy Gardner
 Lisa Leslie
 Ken Norton
 Byron Scott
 Olympia Scott
 Chris Strait
 Tyler, The Creator
 Peter Vidmar
 Frank Ocean

See also

 Notable people from Ladera Heights

References

External links
Ladera Heights Civic Association